R.D. Rajasekhar is an Indian cinematographer who predominantly works in films of Indian languages such as Tamil, Malayalam, Telugu and Hindi. He is a recipient of the Tamil Nadu State Film Award for Best Cinematographer.And film fare Award and SICA award also. He is the member of the Indian Society of Cinematographers (ISC).

Film career

Early career 
After graduating, Rajasekhar found work as a cameraman, assisting to Rajiv menon for about nine years in many advertisement films.

Feature film 
Rajasekhar's first dramatic Indian Tamil-language romance film titled Minnale. The camerawork of the advertisement films impressed his former colleague and frequent collaborator Gautham Vasudev Menon. The film was well received, and popular among youth; subsequently, Rajasekhar and Gautham vasudev menon teamed up again on Kaakha Kaakha (2003). The film was praised for its unique style of visuals and scenic views through his lens, which rajasekhar achieved through a process known as Bleach bypass, where the silver is retained in the print, creating a washed-outlook that reflected in films. Rajasekhar continues serving as cinematographer for films including Red (2002 film), Kaakha Kaakha, Manmadhan (film).

In 2005, Rajasekhar begin his long-term collaboration with the director AR Murugadoss, starting with the Ghajini (2005 film), earned him many recognitions and awards for the cinematography throughout Indian cinema. Director AR Murugadoss had been impressed with rajasekhar. For this murugadoss film Ghajini, Rajasekhar spent some two month fine tuning the look, autumnal yellow and desaturating the overall image. The film won Best Cinematographer award from Tamil Nadu State Film Awards in 2005 and nominated for Best Cinematographer in Filmfare Awards South.

His Malayalam debut film was 4 the People in 2004 and also in same year he made his debut in Telugu film Industry filmed called Gharshana. Again he reunited with director AR Murugadoss on the 2016 Hindi debut film Akira (2016 Hindi film), having previously worked on Ghajini (2005 film).

Awards and recognitions 
He had been nominated for Filmfare Awards South for Best Cinematographer in 2004, winning the Best Cinematographer on his first Filmfare Awards South in 2003 for Kaakha Kaakha. He also received award from prestigious Tamil Nadu State Film Award for Best Cinematographer for film Ghajini (2005 film). He shot Imaikkaa Nodigal (2018) won Best Cinematographer in SIIMA Award for Best Cinematographer - Tamil in the same year after the release.

Filmography

References

Tamil film cinematographers
Living people
Malayalam film cinematographers
Filmfare Awards South winners
M.G.R. Government Film and Television Training Institute alumni
21st-century Indian photographers
Telugu film cinematographers
People from Mayiladuthurai district
Cinematographers from Tamil Nadu
Year of birth missing (living people)